Chatton is a village in Northumberland in England.

Chatton may also refer to:

Chatton (surname)
Chatton, Illinois, an unincorporated community in Houston Township, Adams County, Illinois, USA
Chatton, New Zealand, a locality in the eastern Southland region of New Zealand
Chatton transmitting station, a broadcasting and telecommunications facility in Northumberland, England

See also
 Catton (disambiguation)
 Chatto (disambiguation)